La Scoumoune ("Bad luck") is a 1972 French film directed by José Giovanni, starring Jean Paul Belmondo, Claudia Cardinale and Michel Constantin. It is an adaption of Giovanni's novel L'Excommunié.

La Scoumoune is a remake of a 1961 French movie, A Man Named Rocca, directed by Jean Becker, also based on Giovanni's novel and starring Belmondo in the same part.

Plot
In the mid-1930s mobster Roberto La Rocca (Jean-Paul Belmondo) comes to Marseille to help his friend who was framed by the local crime bosses. Roberto is caught up in clashes between different gangs and as a result serves a long sentence in prison for the murder of several enemy gang members. Once in prison he begins to prepare his escape.

Cast
 Jean-Paul Belmondo : Roberto Borgo
 Claudia Cardinale : Georgia Saratov
 Michel Constantin : Xavier Saratov
 Enrique Lucero : Migli
 Alain Mottet : Ficelle
 Michel Peyrelon : Handsome Charlot
 Philippe Brizard : Fanfan
 Aldo Bufi Landi : Villanova 
 Jacques Debary : Carl
 Gérard Depardieu : Burglar
 Marc Eyraud : Bonnaventure
 Andréa Ferréol : The angry prostitute
 Henri Vilbert : Graville 
 Jacques Rispal: Monsieur Dubois
 Nicolas Vogel : Grégoire
 Jean-Claude Michel : The lawyer
 Dominique Zardi : The convict
 Pierre Collet : The prison director
 Luciano Catenacci

References

External links

Bad Luck at Le Film Guide

1972 films
1970s French-language films
Films about organized crime in France
Films based on works by José Giovanni
Films set in the 1930s
Films set in the 1940s
Films set in Marseille
Films shot in Corsica
French gangster films
French prison films
Films directed by José Giovanni
Films scored by François de Roubaix
Films with screenplays by José Giovanni
1970s French films